The 1929 Loyola Wolf Pack football team was the American football team that represented Loyola College of New Orleans (now known as Loyola University New Orleans) as an independent during the 1929 college football season. In its third season, under head coach Clark Shaughnessy, the team compiled a 4–4–2 record and outscored opponents by a total of 150 to 129. The team played its home games at Loyola University Stadium in New Orleans.

Schedule

References

Loyola
Loyola Wolf Pack football seasons
Loyola Wolf Pack football